Aircraft repair ship is a naval auxiliary ship designed to provide maintenance support to aircraft. Aircraft repair ships provide similar services to seaplane tenders, that also cared for the crew. Aircraft repair ships had their own stores of spare parts, like a depot ship.  Aircraft repair ships had repair personnel and equipment to repair failures or battle damage on aircraft. Aircraft repair ship also did regular aircraft maintenance.

United States Navy
During World War II there was a great demand for aircraft repair ships. The United States Navy aircraft repair ship were manned by repair units, called Carrier Aircraft Service Units. If needed a Carrier Aircraft Service Unit could be redesignated into a Combat Aircraft Service Unit, Scout Observation Service unit or Patrol Service units. These units could also be land-based or on an aircraft repair ship.

Some cargo ships were converted into aircraft repair ships to aid in the repair needs of the World War II U.S. island hopping campaign. The two s, USS Aventinus and USS Chloris, were one type of aircraft repair ship. The  was another type of repair ships, consisting of two ships.

Aircraft carriers are not aircraft repair ships, but do have full aircraft repair shops aboard. Most carrier-based aircraft repairs are done on the aircraft carriers.

Chourre class
 
 

Aventinus class
 USS Aventinus
 USS Chloris

Fabius class
 USS Fabius
 USS Megara

Helicopter Aircraft Repair Ships (ARVH)
 USNS Corpus Christi Bay (T-ARVH-1), ex-AV-5

Lighter-than-Air Aircraft Tender (AZ), for Naval blimp serive
 USS Wright (AZ-1), later AV-1
 USS Patoka (AO-9) operated as a lighter-than-air aircraft tender from 1924 to 1933, but never received the AZ classification

Seaplane tender

The US Navy operated a fleet of seaplane tenders used to maintain the many U.S. Navy seaplanes. Some seaplane tenders were converted cargo ships. The  was the first ship built to be a seaplane tender. Seaplane tender serviced and repaired seaplanes used in forward bases used for long-range patrol. Seaplane tenders were able to do repair and maintenance and had all the supplies needed to operate in remote forward bases for months. Once a land-based forward base was built the seaplane tender could move on to a more forward base. Seaplane tenders acted as barracks, supply depots, workshops, air mechanic and control towers for the planes. The  was converted to repair helicopters for the Vietnam War.

United States Army

The demand for aircraft repair in the United States Army Air Forces in the Pacific Theatre of Operations was so high during World War II, a special program was started called Operation Ivory Soap. Operation Ivory Soap objective was to convert six Liberty ships into aircraft repair ships, called "Aircraft Repair Units (Floating)". With hundreds of Boeing B-29 Superfortress bomber aircraft operating in the Pacific the ships were stocked B-29 parts and B-29 trained personnel. In addition to the Liberty ship for the B-29, eighteen smaller auxiliary ships were built for fighter aircraft support. The eighteen ships provided repair and maintenance to smaller aircraft like the North American P-51 Mustang, Lockheed P-38 fighters, and Sikorsky R-4 helicopters.

Parts
The key to the aircraft repair ships was the supply of parts, keeping ship supply depots stocked with the needed parts. Both the U.S. Navy and the World War II United States Merchant Navy kept parts flowing from the United States to the aircraft repair ships where they were needed.  US Navy operated a fleet of Aviation Stores Issue Ships (AVS) to supply needed parts.

Royal Navy

The British Royal Navy for the support of its World War II aircraft, built three aircraft maintenance carriers. The Royal Navy also operated a fleet of seaplane carriers.

Gallery

See also

Aviation machinist's mate
US Naval Advance Bases
Espiritu Santo Naval Base
Naval Advance Base Saipan
Naval Base Noumea
Repair ship

References

External Links

youtube, Gerald Edward Houppert, Aviation Machinist's Mate Second Class, US Navy, World War Two
youtube, America's WW2 Flying Boat That Came With A Kitchen, Martin PBM Mariner
 Top Secret Project Ivory Soap -- Aircraft Repair Ships
 Operation Ivory Soap
 Operation Ivory Soap was a secret, but no beauty secret
 146 Cong. Rec. 22129 - OPERATION IVORY SOAP
 801st Special Operations Aircraft Maintenance Squadron

United States Navy
Military engineering of the United States
Ship types